The 2020 Missouri Valley Conference women's basketball tournament (also known as the Hoops in the Heartland Tournament) was part of the 2019–20 NCAA Division I women's basketball season and was scheduled be played in Moline, Illinois, from March 12–15, 2020, at the TaxSlayer Center. The winner of the tournament would have received the Missouri Valley Conference's automatic bid to the 2020 NCAA tournament. On March 12, the NCAA announced that the tournament was cancelled due to the coronavirus pandemic.

Seeds

See also
 2020 Missouri Valley Conference men's basketball tournament

References

External links
Hoops in the Heartland
Missouri Valley Conference Official Website

2019–20 Missouri Valley Conference women's basketball season
Missouri Valley Conference women's basketball tournament
Missouri Valley Conference women's basketball tournament